The 1915–16 Loyola Ramblers men's basketball team represents Loyola University Chicago during the 1915–16 college men's basketball season. The ramblers were led by first-year head coach Percy Moore. The team finished the season with an overall record of 10–3–1.

Schedule

|-

References

Loyola Ramblers men's basketball seasons
Loyola Ramblers
Loyola Ramblers
Loyola Ramblers